Rabbah bar bar Hana (רבה בר בר חנה) was a Jewish Talmudist who lived in Babylonia, known as an Amora of the second generation.

Biography
He was the grandson of Hana and the brother of Hiyya. He went to Israel and became a pupil of Rabbi Yochanan, whose sayings he transmitted.

He does not seem to have enjoyed high regard in Israel, for it was taken as a matter of course that Rav Shimon ben Lakish should not do him the honor of addressing him in public. After a somewhat prolonged sojourn in Israel he returned to Babylonia, residing both at Pumbedita and at Sura. In Pumbedita he at first refused to attend the lectures of Rav Judah ben Ezekiel, but he soon became his friend, and was consulted by him in difficult cases. Judah and his pupil Rabbah bar Nahmani once visited Rabbah, who was ill, and submitted a halakhic question to him. While they were there a Zoroastrian priest ("geber") suddenly appeared and extinguished the lamp, the day being a festival of Ormuzd, on which Jews were forbidden to have fire in their houses. Rabbah thereupon sorrowfully exclaimed: "O God, let us live either under Thy protection, or at least under the protection of the children of Esau [the Romans]".

The persecutions of the Babylonian Jews by the Sassanids caused Rabbah to resolve to return to Israel, although it is nowhere said that he carried out that intention. During his residence at Sura he wished to introduce the recitation of the Ten Commandments into the daily prayer, but was dissuaded by Rav Chisda. Later he visited Maḥoza, and he tells of the wonderful feats he saw performed there by a juggler.

Aggadic teachings
Some aggadic sayings by Rabbah bar bar Hana have been preserved. Citing , he compares the Torah to fire, in that as fire does not start of itself neither does the Law endure in solitary study.

Fantastic voyages
Rabbah bar bar Hana's stories of his marvelous experiences during his voyages and his journeys through the desert have become famous. These accounts may be divided into two groups.

In the first group, he records his observations, generally beginning with the words "I have seen."

The second group includes his fantastic adventures on the sea and in the desert. In these stories, one of the most conspicuous figures is the Arab who was the guide of Rabbah and his companions on their journey through the desert. This Arab knew the route so well that he could tell from the odor of the sand when a spring was near. The travelers passed through the desert in which the children of Israel wandered for forty years, and the Arab showed Mount Sinai to Rabbah, who heard the voice of God speaking from the mountain and regretting Israel's exile. The Arab likewise pointed out the place where Korah and his followers had been swallowed by the earth, and from the smoking abyss Rabbah heard the words, "Moses is truth and his teachings are truth, but we are liars". He was shown the gigantic bodies of the Israelites who had died in the desert, lying face upward, and the place where heaven and earth almost touched, so that he could watch the rotation of the heavenly spheres around the earth in twenty-four hours.

Rabbah's stories of his adventures on the sea resemble tales of other navigators concerning the immense size of various marine animals. As an example the following one may be cited: "Once, while on a ship, we came to a gigantic fish at rest, which we supposed to be an island, since there was sand on its back, in which grass was growing. We therefore landed, made a fire, and cooked our meal. But when the fish felt the heat he rolled over, and we would have drowned had not the ship been near". Here the resemblance to the later voyage of Sinbad the Sailor is obvious.

The Talmud tells how his tales were received. In regard to one of them Rav Papa bar Samuel remarked, "Had I not been there I would not have believed it." Rabbah's stories have called forth an entire literature; in addition to the numerous commentaries on the aggadahic portions of the Talmud that dwell by preference on these accounts, more than twenty essays interpreting and annotating them have appeared in various periodicals.

Further reading
 The Juggler and the King, Aharon Feldman, (Philipp Feldheim, 1991). 
 
 The Legends of Rabbah Bar Bar Hannah, Bezalel Naor (Orot/Kodesh Press, 2019).

External links
וְנֶעֶלְמָה מֵעֵינֵי כָל חָי (introductions, source material and explanations on the Aggadot), Tuvia Lipshitz

References

Talmud rabbis
Year of death unknown
Year of birth unknown